Torgrim Eggen (born 29 October 1958) is a Norwegian musician, journalist, magazine editor, novelist and non-fiction writer. Among his books are Gjeld from 1992 and the novel Pynt from 2000. Duften av Havana from 2002 is a cultural history of the cigar, and Manhattan from 2007 is about New York City. Eggen was awarded the Gyldendal's Endowment in 1995 (shared with Terje Holtet Larsen).

Awards 
 2019: Brageprisen for Axel; fra smokken til Ovnen; storyen om Axel Jensen

References

1958 births
Living people
Writers from Oslo
21st-century Norwegian novelists
Norwegian non-fiction writers
Norwegian biographers